"Stand Tall" is the title of an international hit single by Burton Cummings, taken from his eponymous debut album.  The song was released less than two years after "Dancin' Fool", the final hit single by the group for which Cummings had been lead singer, The Guess Who.

The recording was issued as the album's lead single in the fall of 1976, spending 21 weeks on the US Billboard Hot 100 and reaching number 10.  It reached number 5 on the US Cash Box Top 100, and spent four weeks at number 4 in Canada. The track became a Gold record.

"Stand Tall" was an even bigger Adult Contemporary hit, reaching number 2 in the US and spending one week at number 1 in Canada. It was kept from the number 1 position on the US AC chart by the Captain and Tennille's hit, "Muskrat Love".

While the song was climbing the charts, Casey Kasem reported on American Top 40 that shortly following Cummings' departure from The Guess Who to pursue a solo career, his girlfriend of nine years left him for another man. "Stand Tall" was born from him taking his frustration, challenges and despondency to the piano and forging the melody there.

In his native Canada, Burton Cummings was nominated for the Juno Award as 1977 Composer of the Year for "Stand Tall".

Chart performance

Weekly charts

Year-end charts

References

External links
 

1976 singles
1976 songs
Burton Cummings songs
Songs written by Burton Cummings
Song recordings produced by Richard Perry